Aelurillus jocquei is a jumping spider species in the genus Aelurillus that is typically found in Nigeria.

References

Endemic fauna of Nigeria
Salticidae
Fauna of Nigeria
Spiders of Africa
Spiders described in 2011
Taxa named by Wanda Wesołowska